Ilpo is the given name of the following people:

Ilpo Koskela (1945–1997), Finnish ice hockey player
Ilpo Larha (1968–1994), Finnish criminal
Ilpo Nieminen (born 1961), Finnish sprint canoer
Ilpo Nuolikivi (1942–2006), Finnish skier in Nordic combined
Ilpo Salmivirta (born 1983), Finnish ice hockey player
Ilpo Seppälä (born 1953), Finnish wrestler
Ilpo Tiihonen (1950–2021), Finnish writer
Ilpo Väisänen (born 1963), Finnish electronic musician
Ilpo Verno (born 1981), Finnish footballer

Finnish masculine given names